Robert Emery (born 22 March 1983) is an English pianist, conductor and orchestrator.

Life
Robert Emery (born 22 March 1983) is an English pianist, conductor and orchestrator.  He started playing the piano at the age of seven, soon after which he studied with the renowned piano professor Heather Slade-Lipkin and the leading British pianist Stephen Coombs, during which time he won the RBC Concerto competition at age 11, and won the Regional BBC Young Musician competition twice over, as well as reaching the last and best ten pianists in the BBC Young Musician competition. Robert then studied piano with Ruth Nye a pupil of Claudio Arrau and conducting with Neil Thomson a pupil of the renowned Leonard Bernstein at the Royal College of Music. Since making his London debut when he was thirteen, has performed internationally as a recitalist and conductor. In 2009 he became an honorary life Fellow of the Royal Society of Arts (RSA).

Robert Emery has made two solo piano albums, performed for members of the Royal Family and has given a private recital for Members of Parliament at Westminster Hall.  He has been Associate Musical Supervisor for the world premieres of Dallebach Kari das Musical, Gotthelf das Musical, Der Besuch der Alten Dame das Musical; all in Switzerland.  He was also the conductor, director and orchestrator of the Lovebugs/Basel Symphony concerts, and the director and orchestrator of the Seven/21st Century Orchestra concerts, both of which were co-produced by one of Emery's businesses, Arts Festivals Ltd.  He is also known for conducting and playing bare-foot.

He has conducted amongst others the London Philharmonic, Japan Philharmonic Orchestra, Royal Liverpool Philharmonic, British Philharmonic, Singapore Lyric Opera and Chorus, Basel Symphony Orchestra, Arts Symphonic, National Symphoniy Orchestra, Birmingham Philharmonic, Evergreen Philharmonic, Central Aichi and The London Chorus.
 
He has been the conductor for Russell Watson since 2011. He also conducted tracks on the Anthems album.  The orchestra for this album and the 2011 and 2014 tours were Emery's personal orchestra, Arts Symphonic.

Emery created the musical education website, Ted's List, during the pandemic lockdown of 2020.

He also set up a registered charity called The Emery Foundation, with its first project being 'Get Musicians Working' - a scheme to raise funds for professional musicians who were financially struggling due to their situation in the covid pandemic.

Notable work

Pianist
 Purcell Rooms Solo Recital (1996)
 Enlightening Album (1999)
 Robert Emery UK Tour (2002)
 Robert Emery Live in Concert Album (2002)
 Robert Emery UK Tour (2003)
 Stafford Music Festival (2003/04/05/07)

Musicals

 Bat out of Hell - the musical (2017/18/19/21)
 Der Besuch der Alten Dame - das Musical (2013)
 Dällebach Kari - das Musical (2010/2011)
 Gotthelf  - das Musical (2011)
 FIVE TV's My First Carol Concert Tour (2009)
 Zorro (London, 2008)
 Betwixt! (London, 2008)

Conducting
 Bat out of Hell - the musical (Worldwide, 2017/18/19/21)
 Russell Watson (Worldwide, 2011-2014)
 Der Besuch der Alten Dame - das Musical (2013)
 Basel Symphony Orchestral Concert (Basel, Switzerland, 2012)
 London Philharmonic at Christmas (Royal Festival Hall, London, 2012)
 Songs of my Life - Peter Polycarpou (Garrick Theatre, London, 2012)
 Lovebugs & Basel Symphony Orchestra (Basel, Switzerland, 2011)
 Plague Songs with Damon Albarn (Barbican, London, 2010)
 Best of John Williams (Barbican, London, 2021)

Orchestrations and arrangements
 Russell Watson (Worldwide, 2011-2014)
 London Philharmonic at Christmas (Royal Festival Hall, London, 2012)
 Lovebugs & Basel Symphony Orchestra (Basel, Switzerland, 2011)
 21st Century Orchestra (orchestra) (Luzern, Switzerland, 2011)
 Royal Variety Performance (Palladium, London, 2010)
 FIVE TV's My First Carol Concert Tour (2009)
 Betwixt! (London, 2008)

References

External links
 Official website
 Ted's List Musical Education website
 The Emery Foundation website

1983 births
English conductors (music)
British male conductors (music)
Living people
21st-century British conductors (music)
21st-century British male musicians